ENGIN-X is the dedicated materials engineering beamline at the ISIS Neutron and Muon Source in the UK.

The beamline uses neutron diffraction to determine the spacing between layers of atoms in order to measure elastic strain, and thus residual stress deep within crystalline materials. In other words, it uses the atomic lattice planes as an 'atomic strain gauge'. Internal and residual stress in materials have a considerable effect on material properties, including fatigue resistance, fracture toughness and strength.

Applications
 measurement of residual stress in engineering components
 in situ studies of thermomechanical processing of engineering relevant materials
 studies of displacive phase transformations under stress, temperature and electric field
 rock deformation studies
 non-destructive examination of manufacture processes in historical and archaeological artefacts

External links
 ISIS Neutron Source
 ENGIN-X homepage
 

Particle accelerators
Research institutes in Oxfordshire
Science and Technology Facilities Council